Tine Bossuyt (born 10 June 1980) is a retired Belgian swimmer who won a bronze medal in the  freestyle relay at the 2000 European Aquatics Championships. She also competed in the 2000 Summer Olympics in the 100 m and  freestyle events, but did not reach the finals.

After winning 33 national titles and setting 43 national records, Bossuyt retired from competitive swimming in May 2007.

References

External links
 
 Tine BOSSUYT at les-sports.info

1980 births
Living people
Olympic swimmers of Belgium
Swimmers at the 2000 Summer Olympics
Belgian female freestyle swimmers
European Aquatics Championships medalists in swimming
People from Izegem
Sportspeople from West Flanders